Joy Fleming (born Erna Raad, 15 November 1944 – 27 September 2017) was a German singer. She is best known for her performance in the Eurovision Song Contest in 1975. She performed the song "Ein Lied kann eine Brücke sein" and was placed seventeenth out of nineteen countries. Despite its relatively low placing, the song has become popular amongst many Eurovision fans.

She had a hit Disco record with the song and album "The Final Thing" in 1978 on Atlantic Records in the U.S. This was a covered song by the
original artist Steve Bender (a member of the German Disco Group Dschinghis Khan) who also did the first version in 1976.

She made a further Eurovision bid in 1986, participating in the German national contest with the song "Miteinander". Her next involvement with Eurovision came in 2001 when, under a somewhat confusing arrangement with Swiss television she co-sang their contribution to the German final. The song, "Power of Trust"  was performed with two other singers, Lesley Bogaert and Brigitte Oelke, and was placed second. Fleming made another attempt in 2002 and finished as runner-up yet again, this time performing "Joy to the World" with the group Jambalaya.

References

External links
Joy Fleming Management

1944 births
2017 deaths
German emigrants to the United States
Eurovision Song Contest entrants for Germany
German women singers
Eurovision Song Contest entrants of 1975
Musicians from Rhineland-Palatinate
Recipients of the Order of Merit of Baden-Württemberg
People from Donnersbergkreis